Juukan Gorge is a gorge in the Hamersley Range in the Pilbara region of Western Australia, about  from Tom Price. It was named by the daughter of Puutu Kunti Kurrama man Juukan, also known as Tommy Ashburton, who was born at Jukarinya (Mt Brockman).

The gorge is known primarily for a cave that was the only inland site in Australia with evidence of continuous human occupation for over 46,000 years, including through the last Ice Age. The cave was permanently destroyed by mining company Rio Tinto in May 2020.  Ministerial consent had been given to expand Rio Tinto's mine in 2013 under WA legislation.

Prior to its destruction, the cave in Juukan Gorge was a sacred site for the traditional owners of the land, the Puutu Kunti Kurrama and Pinikura (Binigura) peoples.

Archaeological significance 
The archaeological significance of the Juukan Gorge was known at least since 2009, when Slack et al. reported on the "two rock shelters  with Aboriginal occupation starting at least 32,000 years ago and extending throughout the Last Glacial period".

Rio Tinto received ministerial consent to mine the site in 2013 in the pursuit of expanding their iron ore mining operations. A year later, an archaeological dig discovered the site was much older than previously thought, at around 46,000 years old, and rich in artefacts including animal bones in middens showing changes in the local fauna, grindstones and various sacred objects. One particularly significant finding was a length of plaited human hair, woven together from strands from the heads of several different people, about 4,000 years old. DNA testing revealed that the hair had belonged to the direct ancestors of Puutu Kunti Kurrama and Pinikura (PKKP) people alive today.

PKKP heritage manager Heather Builth told Rio Tinto that the site was one of the "top five" most significant in the whole of the Pilbara region, and archaeologist Michael Slack had told them that one of the rock shelters, Juukan 2, was of "the highest archaeological significance in Australia", saying that its significance "could not be overstated", being "[the only] site of this age with faunal remains in unequivocal association with stone tools".

Cave destruction 
The cave was ultimately blasted along with another Aboriginal sacred site on 24 May 2020 as part of Rio Tinto's expansion of the Brockman 4 mine, despite the PKKP having said many times that they wanted to preserve the site, and issuing an urgent request to halt the blasts five days beforehand. The Aboriginal Heritage Act 1972 (WA) does not allow for mining consent to be renegotiated on the basis of new information, and the blasting was legal under a Section 18 exemption in the Act. WA Aboriginal Affairs Minister Ben Wyatt was as of August 2020 reviewing the Act.

Rio Tinto response
After this aroused widespread international media coverage and public outcry, Rio Tinto apologised to the Puutu Kunti Kurrama and the Pinikura peoples for the destruction of the caves and for causing distress. The CEO of the iron ore group apologised on behalf of the company on 17 June. The National Native Title Council (NNTC) issued a request to the federal government asking for national legislation for Indigenous cultural heritage.

A Rio Tinto board internal review under Michael L'Estrange, an independent non-executive director of Rio Tinto and former Australian high commissioner to the UK, ascribed the mistake to a series of flaws in their systems, sharing of information, engaging with the Indigenous people and decision-making, and promised to implement new measures, including "the need for a greater prioritisation of partnerships and relationships with Traditional Owners and First Nations people from senior operational leaders and teams". CEO Jean-Sebastien Jacques would be losing  in bonuses. They had missed many opportunities to halt the plan. The board review was published on their website on 24 August 2020.

On 11 September 2020, it was announced that, as a result of the destruction at Juukan Gorge, CEO Jean-Sebastien Jacques and two other Rio Tinto executives would step down. The National Native Title Council (NNTC) welcomed the move, but said that there should be an independent review into the company's procedures and culture to ensure that such an incident could never happen again. Rio Tinto admitted their error, issued an apology via media and on their website, and also committed to building relationships with the traditional owners as well as getting Indigenous people into leadership roles in the company. One analysis of what went wrong in Rio Tinto to allow the destruction to occur suggested that processes failed at several levels, but mainly due to its "segmented organisational structure", a poor reporting structure, and Indigenous relations not being properly represented at a high enough level. Simon Thompson, chairman of Rio Tinto corporation, announced on 3 March 2021 that he would resign despite record profits.

Parliamentary inquiry
The "Inquiry into the destruction of 46,000-year-old caves at the Juukan Gorge in the Pilbara region of Western Australia" was referred to the Joint Standing Committee on Northern Australia on 11 June 2020, to report by 20 September 2020. Rio Tinto appeared before the inquiry in August and admitted that it did not advise the traditional owners of other options besides blasting. Senior executives did not learn of the significance of the site until 21 May. The chair, Liberal MP Warren Entsch, requested permission from WA Premier Mark McGowan for a small group of politicians and staff to travel to the region in order to have face-to-face hearings with traditional owners early in September. Hansard will ensure accurate reporting of the meetings, and extra precautions are necessary because of the COVID-19 pandemic in Australia.

Apart from Entsch, the members of the Inquiry were:

 Senator Anthony Chisholm (Deputy Chair)
 Anika Wells MP
 Senator Patrick Dodson
 Senator Rachel Siewert
 Senator Matthew Canavan
 George Christensen MP
 Senator Dean Smith
 Phillip Thompson MP
 Warren Snowdon MP

Submissions
There were 160 submissions received by the committee between June and November 2020. Tanya Butler, who was WA registrar of Aboriginal heritage sites and secretariat of the Aboriginal Cultural Materials Committee (ACMC), was questioned by Warren Entsch during the inquiry. The ACMC is responsible under the Aboriginal Heritage Act 1972 for assessing applications to disturb Aboriginal heritage sites under Section 18 of the Act, but the definition of an Aboriginal site had been changed over the years. Butler said that the ACMC had not been aware of the full significance of the Juukan Gorge sites when it was assessed in 2013.

Submission 152 showed that Rio Tinto had received ministerial consent to damage the site in 2013 under Section 18 in the pursuit of expanding their iron ore mining operations. The PKKP had not objected to the Section 18, despite having taken part to the excavation works in 2009 (see Slack report above).

Interim report (December 2020)

On 9 December 2020, the inquiry published its interim report, entitled Never Again. The report "highlights the disparity in power between Indigenous peoples and industry in the protection of Indigenous heritage, and the serious failings of legislation designed to protect Indigenous heritage and promote Native Title". Seven recommendations were made, including a moratorium on mining in the area and rehabilitation of the site. The report also recommended that compensation should be paid to the traditional owners. It said that the destruction of the caves was "inexcusable", and also called upon mining companies to voluntarily stop acting on existing approvals. While the inquiry and report was bipartisan, there was one dissenting voice with regard to the moratorium; WA Liberal senator Dean Smith was concerned that essential work on infrastructure would be unnecessarily delayed.

The report also recommends that the Western Australian Government review and reform the current state heritage laws, and that the federal government review the Aboriginal and Torres Strait Islander Heritage Protection Act 1984. It also outlines deficiencies in the WA Act.

After the publication of the report, Senator Pat Dodson tweeted "The destruction of these ancient sites was a disaster for our nation and the world".

The inquiry continues to investigate the failings of state and Commonwealth heritage protection laws, as Rio Tinto's action was technically legal, after they had obtained permission in 2013, under Section 18 of WA's Aboriginal Heritage Act 1972 to go ahead with their blasting operations. The full report is due to be published in 2021.

References

Further reading 
 Puutu Kunti Kurrama and Pinikura People Submission to the Joint Standing Committee on Northern Australia Inquiry into the destruction of 46,000 year old caves at the Juukan Gorge in the Pilbara region of Western Australia, Submission 129, Parliament of Australia, 2020.

Hamersley Range
Australian Aboriginal cultural history
Australian heritage law
2020 in Australia
Rio Tinto (corporation)
Former landforms
Archaeological sites in Western Australia